The Salt-N-Pepa Show, which premiered on October 14, 2007 on VH1, is a reality show documenting the events from the life of Salt-n-Pepa, several years after their breakup.

Episodes

Season 1 (2007)
Two themes emerged from the first episode:  Pepa's lingering bitterness from how Salt abruptly departed the group years ago, which Salt attempted to soothe with an apology; and a cultural conflict between the ladies, as Salt's strong Christian commitment leads her to renounce the duo's raunchy lyrics and dance moves from their former performing days, whereas Pepa wants to continue performing, like the "old" days.  The remainder of the episodes show the duo as they explore the idea of reuniting.

Season 2 (2008)

References

External links
VH1 Show Home Page
Salt N Pepa's Official Fan Site

2000s American reality television series
2007 American television series debuts
2008 American television series endings
VH1 original programming
English-language television shows
Television shows set in New York City
African-American reality television series
Television series based on singers and musicians